Pawonków  (German Pawonkau) is a village in Lubliniec County, Silesian Voivodeship, in southern Poland. It is the seat of the gmina (administrative district) called Gmina Pawonków.

References

Villages in Lubliniec County